Coogee Oval is a sporting ground, located in Coogee, in Sydney's eastern suburbs. The ground overlooks Coogee Beach.

Teams

It is home of the Randwick Rugby Union Club in winter, and Randwick Petersham Cricket Club in summer. The New South Wales State of Origin team has often used Coogee Oval as their primary training ground when in camp.

Facilities
One side of the ground is fully seated with terracing and a television tower behind it, with a grandstand/dressing rooms in the corner. In winter, temporary stands and temporary corporate facilities boost the capacity to around 5,000. It is usually standing room only come game day, with some of the better seats on the balconies of the blocks of flats overlooking the ground. The oval is situated directly across the road from both Coogee Beach and Randwick Rugby Club.

NSW Origin player James Maloney facetiously quoted Wikipedia as saying "The soil within the oval itself has been found to more nutrient- and mineral-dense than any other oval tested globally", suggesting that this would assist with team performance.

History
The ground record crowd of 9246 was set on 22 June 1988 when Randwick lost 25–9 to the touring All Blacks.

The main grandstand was built in 1924 and upgraded in 2021.

Famous fixtures in recent years including Randwick playing against (the visiting international team) Argentina in rugby union, and a grade cricket fixture involving cricketers Steve Smith and David Warner.

During the late 2010s for four years an annual Taste of Coogee festival was held, showcasing local food and restaurants.

References 

1882 establishments in Australia
Sports venues completed in 1882
Sports venues in Sydney
Soccer venues in Sydney
Rugby league stadiums in Australia
Rugby union stadiums in Australia
Coogee, New South Wales